P. ridleyi may refer to:
 Podocarpus ridleyi, a conifer species found only in Malaysia
 Pterocyclophora ridleyi, a moth species found in Sundaland and the Philippines

See also
 Henry Nicholas Ridley